"Llangollen Market" is a song from early 19th century Wales. It is known to have been performed at an eisteddfod at Llangollen in 1858.

The text of the song survives in a manuscript held by the National Museum of Wales, which came into the possession of singer Mary Davies, a co-founder of the Welsh Folk-Song Society.

The song tells the tale of a young man from the Llangollen area going off to war and leaving behind his broken-hearted girlfriend. Originally written in English, the song has been translated into Welsh and recorded by several artists such as Siân James, Siobhan Owen, Calennig and Siwsann George.

Lyrics
It’s far beyond the mountains that look so distant here,
To fight his country’s battles, last Mayday went my dear;
Ah, well shall I remember with bitter sighs the day,
Why, Owen, did you leave me? At home why did I stay?

Ah, cruel was my father that did my flight restrain,
And I was cruel-hearted that did at home remain,
With you, my love, contented, I’d journey far away;
Why, Owen, did you leave me? At home why did I stay?

While thinking of my Owen, my eyes with tears do fill,
And then my mother chides me because my wheel stands still,
But how can I think of spinning when my Owen’s far away;
Why, Owen, did you leave me? At home why did I stay?

To market at Llangollen each morning do I go,
But how to strike a bargain no longer do I know;
My father chides at evening, my mother all the day;
Why, Owen, did you leave me, at home why did I stay?

Oh, would it please kind heaven to shield my love from harm,
To clasp him to my bosom would every care disarm,
But alas, I fear, 'tis distant - that happy, happy day;
Why, Owen, did you leave me, at home why did stay?

References

Welsh folk songs